Raji's was a rock and roll nightclub in central Hollywood, open in the 1980s and early 1990s.  It was located in the Hastings Hotel building, 6160 Hollywood Blvd.  The space had previously been occupied by a Greek restaurant called The King's Palace.

It was one of the great sweaty, smoke-filled 'dives' of rock.  It featured performances by iconic bands such as Green Day, Guns N' Roses, The Flaming Lips, Heatmiser (which featured the late Elliott Smith), Redd Kross,  Hole, Jane's Addiction, Thin White Rope, 45 Grave, Arab and The Suburban Turbans, The Untold Fables, The Dream Syndicate, The Lonesome Strangers, Snake Farm, The Billy Bremner Band, The Little Kings, The Shades, Tex & the Horseheads, Lock-Up, Mary's Danish, The Miracle Workers, Social Distortion, The Electric Ferrets, the Mentors, GG Allin, The Nymphs, Blackbird, Clay Idols and Los Lobos, as well as out-of-town acts like Nirvana (as seen on the cover of Nirvana's 7" single, "Sliver"), Pink Fairies, Pussy Galore, Mod Fun and Kyuss. Top-draw local acts like Thelonious Monster, The Muffs, the Red Aunts, The Lazy Cowgirls, Claw Hammer, Beck, Trash Can School, Pigmy Love Circus, Oiler, Kryptonite Nixon, Butt Trumpet, Kill Buddha, the Sacred Hearts, the Creamers, The Humpers, and many other underground music bands found enthusiastic crowds as well.

The club was also a hot spot for musicians, who would often come to watch bands and have drinks.  Notable customers included Jonathan Richman, members of R.E.M., Top Jimmy, Gil T, and Carlos Guitarlos (of  Top Jimmy & The Rhythm Pigs), Billy Bremner of Rockpile, Nino Del Pesco (The Lonesome Strangers), Viki Peterson (of The Bangles), Texacala Jones or Mike Martt (of Tex & the Horseheads), Bernie Bernstein (The Little Kings), Flea (of Red Hot Chili Peppers), Pope, Beck, Mike Savage (of Pigmy Love Circus), Texas Terri, and more with an inside few often invited to stay after hours to party with the infamous Danny "Dobbs" Wilson, founder and booker of the club, and his regular cast of characters which included Bernie the doorman, Autumn the bartender, floor security Clint, Tony T, Dirty Ed, The Pope and sound man Brian "Up-stein" Green.

One could see the likes of Dwarves, Spoon, Fishbone, My Other Side, Meat Puppets, Backbiter, Impatient Youth, Red River, Suplex Slam, The Red Devils/Blue Shadows, DC-3, Rage Against the Machine, Dumpster, Dead, White, and Blue, White Zombie, Haunted Garage, Pennywise, Green Day, The Reverend Horton Heat, Top Jimmy, X, The Muffs, Wetherbell, Texorcist, Circle One, The Gears, The D.I.'s, Adolescents, Dogstar, The Uninvited, The Superkools, Claw Hammer, Two Free Stooges, The Flesh Eaters, Continental Drifters, Kyuss, Buglamp, Cake, The Scraps, Two Bass Hit, The Marigolds, The Jack Brewer Band, The Melodiacs, and The Skulls, among countless others.

The venue sustained a lightning bolt gash near the bar due to the 1994 Northridge earthquake.  The club continued to operate for three months after it was red tagged.  A fire marshall shut the venue down for good and Larry Mann moved his operations to Hell's Gate in the then, dangerous Yucca corridor.  The building was demolished and is now a parking lot for the MTA.

The Ski Room, a bar located at 5851 Sunset Blvd., a few blocks away from the club's former location, was renamed Raji's and run by the same family that ran the club in its last two years, until 2004, when it closed due to the gentrification of central Hollywood.
It's now called The Bar.

Danny "Dobbs" Wilson died in 2010.

Some scenes from Chris Cornell's 1999 music video "Can't Change Me" were shot at the club.

References

Nightclubs in Los Angeles County, California
Defunct organizations based in Hollywood, Los Angeles